Winter X Games XXV was held from 29 to 31 January 2021 in Aspen, Colorado, United States.

Medal table

Medal summary

Snowboard

Ski

Rocket League

Ref

References

External links
 
X Games Aspen official website

XXIII
2021 in winter sports
2021 in American sports
2021 in sports in Colorado
Winter multi-sport events in the United States
Skiing competitions in the United States
ESPN
January 2021 sports events in the United States